Laura Marie Russello (born May 18, 1978) is a community organizer, activist, and textile designer. She is best known as former Executive Director of Michigan Peaceworks, and as designer of the minimalist line of winter scarves entitled "Laura Russello."

Biography

Early years

Laura Marie Russello was born to Louis and Mary Russello in Ypsilanti, Michigan.

Russello graduated in 2006 with a master's degree from the University of Michigan School of Social Work.

Career

Russello first worked as the environmental health organizer for Clean Water Action in Ann Arbor. She has also been involved in two international projects-Project South Africa in 2005, and research into Teen Drug and Tobacco Use Trends in Santiago, Chile in 2007.

Recently, Russello worked as Executive Director of Michigan Peaceworks and was a community organizer and activist in Ann Arbor, Michigan. Russello involves the arts in her activism, helping to coordinate the Ann Arbor "Peaceworks Through Art" public mural  with artist Mary Thiefels, working with the Main Street Area Association of Ann Arbor and the city's  Downtown Development Authority.

On March 16, 2009, the mayor of Ann Arbor, John Hieftje, issued a proclamation in support of Laura Russello's candidacy for The Washtenaw County Bar Association's "Liberty Bell" Award, which she subsequently won.

After moving to New York City in 2011, Russello debuted her line of winter scarves under the brand name "Laura Russello."

Works

 "The Reach of a Youth-Oriented Anti-Tobacco Media Campaign on Adult Smokers." With N. Dietz and J. Delva. Drug and Alcohol Dependence, vol. 93, no. 1-2 (January 11, 2008), pp. 180-184.

Awards

 University of Michigan School of Social Work Scholarship, 2005
 University of Denver Project South Africa Scholarship, 2005
 Washtenaw County Bar Association "Liberty Bell" Award, 2009

Footnotes

People from Ann Arbor, Michigan
1978 births
Living people
Eastern Michigan University alumni
University of Michigan School of Social Work alumni